Sengan (also Romanized as Sengān; also known as Sīngān) is a village in Haq Rural District of Nalus District of Oshnavieh County, West Azerbaijan province, Iran. At the 2006 National Census, its population was 925 in 151 households. The following census in 2011 counted 994 people in 265 households. The latest census in 2016 showed a population of 1,198 people in 317 households; it was the largest village in its rural district.

References 

Oshnavieh County

Populated places in West Azerbaijan Province

Populated places in Oshnavieh County